United Right may refer to:

 United Right of Albania (Partia e te Drejtave te Bashkuara Shqiptare), an Albanian political party
 United Right (Israel) (Yamina), an Israeli political alliance 
 United Right (Italy) (Destre Unite), an Italian political party 
 United Right (Poland) (Zjednoczona Prawica), a Polish political alliance